This article lists the speakers of the National Assembly of Zimbabwe and its historical antecedents: House of Assembly of Southern Rhodesia in 1923–1953 and 1963–1965, Federal Assembly of Rhodesia and Nyasaland in 1953–1963, House of Assembly of Rhodesia in 1965–1979 and House of Assembly of Zimbabwe in 1980–2013.

Southern Rhodesia (1923–1964) and Rhodesia (1964–1965)

Federation of Rhodesia and Nyasaland (1953–1963)

Rhodesia (1965–1979)
House of Assembly was unicameral legislature from 1965 to 1970, and the lower house of the bicameral Parliament of Rhodesia from 1970 to 1979.

Zimbabwe Rhodesia (1979) and Southern Rhodesia (1979–1980)

Zimbabwe (1980–present)

See also
Southern Rhodesian Legislative Assembly
National Assembly of Zimbabwe

References

Zimbabwe, Speakers of the House of Assembly of
Speakers of the House of Assembly
1923 establishments in Southern Rhodesia
1980 establishments in Zimbabwe